Javier Inocente Pérez Torres (born September 23, 1969), better known as Javier Valcárcel, is a Cuban actor. He was born in Havana. He made his debut in 1990 in the play Las Criadas by Jean Genet. In 1992 he participated in Divina Obsesión, opening the way for telenovelas.

Career 
After its debut on TV participates in soap operas: Bit of heaven and anyone Cruz. In 1996 he participated in "The forgiveness of sins". Followed by "Sin of Love", "Target Women", "All Woman" and "Little Women." 
Some of his plays are: Box office for unspoken words, "The girl blue jeans" and "The Pelikano".

Filmography

References

External links

Living people
1969 births
Cuban male stage actors
People from Havana
Cuban male soap opera actors
20th-century Cuban male actors
21st-century Cuban male actors